Siddharth Nagar may refer to:

Siddharthnagar district, Uttar Pradesh, India
Siddharth Nagar, Nepal